Tupac Shakur (1971–1996) was an American rapper, songwriter, and actor.

Tupac may also refer to:
 Tupac (name), a list of people with the given name
 "Tupac", a song by DaBaby from his 2019 album Baby on Baby
 Operation Tupac, Inter-Services Intelligence activities in India